Ptychadena bibroni (commonly known as the broad-banded grassland frog) is a species of frog in the family Ptychadenidae.
It is found in Burkina Faso, Cameroon, Central African Republic, Chad, Democratic Republic of the Congo, Ivory Coast, Gambia, Ghana, Guinea, Liberia, Mali, Nigeria, Senegal, Sierra Leone, Togo, possibly Benin, possibly Guinea-Bissau, and possibly Sudan.
Its natural habitats are dry savanna, moist savanna, intermittent freshwater marshes, rural gardens, heavily degraded former forest, and canals and ditches.

References

 Lee Dietterich, Jasmine Manalel & C. Michael Hogan. 2013. Species account for Ptychadena bibroni. ed. B. Zimkus. African Amphibians Lifedesk

Ptychadena
Taxonomy articles created by Polbot
Amphibians described in 1845